Provincetown is a New England town located at the very tip of Cape Cod, Massachusetts.

Provincetown may also refer to:
Provincetown (CDP), Massachusetts, a Census-Designated Place which includes the more dense "downtown" part of Provincetown
Provincetown Harbor, the harbor which borders the town of Provincetown, Massachusetts
Provincetown Historic District, o portion of downtown Provincetown that is listed in the National Register of Historic Places
Provincetown Municipal Airport, the small airport that serves Provincetown and nearby communities
Provincetown-Boston Airline, a now-defunct commuter airline that once served those markets
Provincetown Public Library (old), the historic building that once housed the town's public library 
Provincetown High School, the high school that is scheduled to close in the Spring of 2014
Provincetown Players, a theater company that started in Provincetown in 1915, moved to New York City, and launched the career of playwright Eugene O’Neill 
Provincetown Playhouse, a theater in Greenwich village that was home to the above company, wherein Bette Davis made her New York stage debut

Provincetown, Massachusetts